Albrecht Roser (21 May 1922 in Friedrichshafen, Germany – 17 April 2011) was a German master puppeteer based in Stuttgart, Germany.

Background and artistic contribution
Roser has made a major contribution working with marionettes. He first came to public attention in 1951 with his marionette, Clown Gustaf. Another of his characters, Grandmother, is outwardly charming but savagely humorous in her observations about all aspects of society and the absurdities of life.

Roser has toured worldwide with resounding success. He has made 7 tours through Asia and Australia and 17 tours in North and South America. A large number of his tours were organised with assistance from the German Cultural Institute.

In 1977, Roser was invited to spend a semester as guest artist at the University of Connecticut, United States of America, by the Department of Puppetry. In 1983 he established the Figurentheaterschule Stuttgart, a school for puppetry at the Conservatory for Music and the Dramatic Arts, where he was professor and head of the department.

Roser's work was admired by master puppeteer Jim Henson, who made a film on Roser's work.

Notes

References

External links
Albrecht Roser and his marionettes
The World of Puppetry with Albrecht Roser
Professor Albrecht Roser
Photos of Albrecht Roser manipulating his marionettes
Information from the Goethe Institut, Germany on the work of students of Professor Albrecht Roser
Quotes on puppetry from Albrecht Roser, Third International String Puppetry Institute held at the University of Connecticut, August 1998

German designers
German puppeteers
German theatre directors
Performing arts presenters
People from Stuttgart
Recipients of the Cross of the Order of Merit of the Federal Republic of Germany
Recipients of the Order of Merit of Baden-Württemberg
1922 births
2011 deaths